Global Environmental Change is a scientific journal publishing peer-reviewed research on environmental change that was established in 1990. It is published by Elsevier.  the editor-in-chief is Eduardo Brondizio.  the journal had an impact factor of 10.466, according to Journal Citation Reports, ranking it 4th out of 265 journals in the category environmental sciences.

References

External Links 

 Global Environmental Change, Volume 72, January 2022

Elsevier academic journals
Publications established in 1990
English-language journals
Environmental science journals